Desmodium gangeticum is commonly known by the name salparni. It can be found throughout most parts of India and Himalayas.

Description 
Desmodium gangeticums growth habit is a small shrub. It can grow up to 2–4 feet tall. The leaves are simple and alternative. They have an oblong shape and pinnate venation. They tend to grow up to 15 cm in length and 5 cm in width. The flowers have bilateral symmetry and are characterized for purple and white colors, and they have 3 petals. The inflorescence is indeterminate meaning that the growing flowers are on the top while the full flowers are on the lower part. The sexual reproductive system is hermaphroditic.

Ecology 
Desmodium gangeticum is found in places with partial shade or in the open, and very rarely in deep shade. It is native to tropical Africa, Asia, and northern Australia. Its biome is typically anthropogenic habitats in the lowlands, under ever wet or seasonal conditions. This plant grows best in dry conditions with clayey loam soils that are alkaline and moderately calcareous. The plant also uses pollinator such as bees and is frequently grazed by cattle which aids with seed dispersal. The plant spreads its seed through the small hairs on the seedpods that readily cling to human skin and clothing as well as other animals’ fur and feathers. This ensures that the seed gets maximum dispersal. Due to this method the plant is considered an invasive weed in some habitats. This species has a symbiotic relationship with certain soil bacteria; these bacteria form nodules on the roots and fix atmospheric nitrogen. One fungal parasite has been recorded on this species from India (Synchytrium desmodiicola), most seedlings come up in July after the first few showers and flowering and fruiting take place from October to February.

Cultivation and Uses 
Medically, the plant has many benefits. A medicine made from the leaves of the plant can be used to prevent and treat stones in the gall bladder, kidneys or bladder. The leaves can also be made into a moist ointment to mend headaches. The plant is deemed to restore proper functioning of the body by increasing health and vitality, supporting the structure of organ tissue, reduce fever and cough, and support digestion. The root of the plant can be used for toothache pain in addition to cleaning wounds and ulcers with a decoction. Effective use of the medicine is from both external and internal use. The entirety of the plant is classified as an anthelmintic which means it can be used to remove parasitic worms and other internal parasites.

References

External links 
 
 
 
 

gangeticum